José Manuel Franco Pardo (born 1957) is a Spanish politician. A member of the Spanish Socialist Workers' Party (PSOE), he has been the Secretary-General of the PSOE of the Community of Madrid since September 2017. Since 2021, he is the president of the Consejo Superior de Deportes.

Early life 
Born in A Pobra do Brollón (province of Lugo) on 8 September 1957, soon after his family moved to Monforte de Lemos. Franco, who dropped university studies in Mathematics early, graduated in law. From 1982 to 1987 he worked as math teacher. He is a career civil servant in the Ministry of Defence. Franco, who had joined the Spanish Socialist Workers' Party (PSOE) in 1981, was a member of the Monforte de Lemos city council from 1984 to 1986.

Regional MP 
He became a member of the Assembly of Madrid for the first time after the 1995 regional election. He renovated his seat in the 1999, May 2003, October 2003, 2007, 2011 and 2015 elections.

During this spell in the regional legislature, he has served as PSOE spokesperson in the Job Commission, president of the Budget Commission, and as spokesman in the Commission of Transport and Infraestructures. After the forced resignation of Tomás Gómez in February 2015, he became the spokesman of the parliamentary group. After the 2015 election, he became deputy spokesman second to Ángel Gabilondo.

PSOE regional leader in Madrid 
In 2017, Franco endorsed Pedro Sánchez in the PSOE primary election campaign, becoming one of Sánchez's most trusted advisors during the campaign. Franco defended the notion that in a federal plurinational state result of a potential reform of the Constitution, Madrid, as one of the entities of that State, in the case it had to be a "nation", so be it, "we should not be scared of the name". He contested the September 2017 primary election to the leadership of the Spanish Socialist Workers' Party of the Community of Madrid (PSOE-M). He won the process (with a support of the 71% of the voters) and became the new Secretary-General of the organization.

Notes

References 

1957 births
Living people
Spanish municipal councillors
Members of the 4th Assembly of Madrid
Members of the 5th Assembly of Madrid
Members of the 6th Assembly of Madrid
Members of the 7th Assembly of Madrid
Members of the 8th Assembly of Madrid
Members of the 9th Assembly of Madrid
Members of the 10th Assembly of Madrid
Members of the Socialist Parliamentary Group (Assembly of Madrid)
Members of the Socialist–Progressive Parliamentary Group (Assembly of Madrid)
Members of the 14th Congress of Deputies (Spain)